William Davy may refer to:

William Gabriel Davy (1780–1856), British Army general who fought in the Peninsular War
William Davy (lawyer) (died 1780), English barrister
William Davy (divine) (1743–1826), English priest and writer

See also
William Davie (disambiguation)
Davy (disambiguation)